A shingle beach (also referred to as rocky beach or pebble beach) is a beach which is armoured with pebbles or small- to medium-sized cobbles (as opposed to fine sand). Typically, the stone composition may grade from characteristic sizes ranging from  diameter.   

While this beach landform is most commonly found in Europe, examples are found in Bahrain, North America, and a number of other world regions, such as the west coast of New Zealand's South Island, where they are associated with the shingle fans of braided rivers.

The ecosystems formed by this unique association of rock and sand allow colonization by a variety of rare and endangered species.

Formation
Shingle beaches are typically steep, because the waves easily flow through the coarse, porous surface of the beach, decreasing the effect of backwash erosion and increasing the formation of sediment into a steeply sloping beach.

Tourism
Shingle beaches are rare, made up of thousands of smooth rocks with varying geological qualities. The ocean naturally smooths the various rocks over time with crashing waves. Shingle beaches are popular for the varying rock types that can be found.

Examples 

 Alby, Öland, Sweden
 Birdling's Flat, Canterbury Region, New Zealand
 Brighton, Sussex, England
 Chesil Beach, Dorset, England
 Dungeness, Kent, England
 Egypt Beach, Scituate, Massachusetts, United States of America 
 Étretat, Normandy, France
 Fécamp, Normandy, France
 Hillsburn, Nova Scotia, Canada
 Hawar Islands, Bahrain
 Herne Bay, Kent, England
 Humarock, Scituate, Massachusetts, United States of America  
 Lambert's Cove Beach, Martha's Vineyard, Massachusetts
 Le Tilleul, Seine-Maritime, Normandy, France
 Nice, Alpes-Maritimes, France
 Osmussaar, Lääne County, Estonia
 Spey Bay, Moray, Scotland
 Slapton Sands, Devon, England
 Short Beach, Oregon, United States of America 
 Southsea, Hampshire, England
 The Stade, Sussex, England
 Sõrve Pensula, Estonia
 Yport, Normandy, France
 Zlatni Rat, Bol, Croatia
 Zrće, Novalja, Gajac, Croatia
 Jaz Beach, Budva, Montenegro
 Bagolatao Beach, Minalabac, Camarines Sur, Philippines

See also
 Machair
 Storm beach

References

Further reading
 Chapman, V. J. (2016) Coastal Vegetation chapter 9: Shingle Beaches. Second edition, Elsevier. 

Beaches
Coastal geography